The Rubin Museum of Art, also known as the Rubin Museum is a museum dedicated to the collection, display, and preservation of the art and cultures of the Himalayas, the Indian subcontinent, Central Asia and other regions within Eurasia, with a permanent collection focused particularly on Tibetan art. It is located at 150 West 17th Street between the Avenue of the Americas (Sixth Avenue) and Seventh Avenue in the Chelsea neighborhood of Manhattan in New York City.

History
The museum originated from a private collection of Himalayan art which Donald and Shelley Rubin had been assembling since 1974 and which they wanted to display. In 1998, the Rubins paid $22 million for the building that had been occupied by Barneys New York, a designer fashion department store that had filed for bankruptcy. The building was remodeled as a museum by preservation architects Beyer Blinder Belle.

The museum opened on October 2, 2004, and displays more than 1,000 objects including paintings, sculpture, and textiles, as well as ritual objects from the 2nd to the 20th centuries.  The new facade on 17th Street and the five floors of galleries were influenced by Tibetan art, and were conceived by New York-based museum architects Celia Imrey and Tim Culbert. Its graphic identity was conceived by graphic designer Milton Glaser.

Funding
The museum's exhibitions and programs are supported by the National Endowment for the Humanities, the National Endowment for the Arts, the New York State Music Fund, the New York State Council on the Arts, the New York City Department of Cultural Affairs, other corporate and foundation donors, and a roster of corporate and individual members.

In 2011, the museum announced that founders Donald and Shelley Rubin would give a five-year, $25 million gift to support operations, exhibitions, and programs. Donald Rubin also planned to step down as chief executive, although the couple were to continue to lead the museum's board. This presented challenges and led to a restructuring ahead of the funds running out in 2020.

Building
The 70,000-square-foot museum occupies what was formerly a portion of the Barneys department store in Manhattan's Chelsea neighborhood. It was acquired in 1998 and renovated extensively from 2000 to 2004. The renovation and new design elements were the results of a collaboration headed by the architectural firm of Beyer Blinder Belle and including Atelier Imrey Culbert (associate museum designers) and Milton Glaser Incorporated. Many of the architectural details within the building were retained, most notably Andree Putman's steel-and-marble staircase that spirals through the six-story gallery tower. In addition to gallery space for featured exhibitions, the museum includes space for contemporary and historical photography, an art-making studio, a theater for multimedia events and performances, a café, and a gift shop. In September 2011, the museum opened a new 5,000 square-foot Education Center adjacent to the main museum building. The building is also home to the Rubin's other art project, The 8th Floor, which opened in 2010.

Exhibitions

Among the museum's inaugural exhibitions were "Methods of Transcendance", "Portraits of Transmission" and "The Demonic Divine in Himalayan Art". In 2006, a three-part exhibition called "Holy Madness" spotlighted siddhas with "Portraits of Tantric Siddhas," "Mahasiddhas at Gyantse," and "Mahasiddhas at Alchi."  

After a shift in the volume of rotating exhibits in 2019 due to funding challenges, the museum began to focus more on experiences and the permanent collection.
In September 2021, the museum opened a new permanent installation, called Mandala Lab dedicated to emotional health and wellness.

In addition to its exhibits, the museum is also known for its wide-ranging public programming series.

See also

 Culture of New York City
 List of museums and cultural institutions in New York City

References

External links

Virtual tour of the Rubin Museum of Art provided by Google Arts & Culture

2004 establishments in New York City
Asian art museums in New York (state)
Art museums established in 2004
Museums in Manhattan
Himalayan art
Tibetan art
Tibetology
Art museums and galleries in New York City
Chelsea, Manhattan
Tibetan-American culture